The Saline County Courthouse is a historic three-story building in Wilber, Nebraska, and the courthouse of Saline County, Nebraska. It is the second county courthouse built in Wilber; the first courthouse was built in 1878. The current courthouse was built in 1927, with Bedford limestone. It was designed by architect Marcus L. Evans in the Classical Revival style, with "acroteria, fluted Doric columns, and triglyphs." It has been listed on the National Register of Historic Places since July 5, 1990.

References

National Register of Historic Places in Saline County, Nebraska
Neoclassical architecture in Nebraska
Government buildings completed in 1927
Courthouses on the National Register of Historic Places in Nebraska
County courthouses in Nebraska